The Minnesota Public Interest Research Group (also known as MPIRG) describes itself as "a grassroots, non-partisan, nonprofit, student-directed organization that empowers and trains students and engages the community to take collective action in the public interest throughout the state of Minnesota."

History 

MPIRG was incorporated on February 17, 1971. Students at the University of Minnesota collected 25,200 signatures that year to start the first MPIRG chapter in Minnesota and start the first PIRG in the nation. College students collected more than 50,000 signatures in all to start chapters at college campuses across the state. The motivating idea was for students to join together in collective action to advocate in the public interest, and to use the activity fees they collected from each school to support a staff of professionals that could train them to become powerful advocates in the public policy arena. MPIRG's unique strategy to mobilize students has led to a long list of accomplishments, including protecting the Boundary Waters Canoe Area Wilderness in northern Minnesota from environmental damage and promoting stricter ethical standards for lobbyists.

Chapters 

MPIRG had chapters at 6 colleges and universities across the state of Minnesota, including:

Augsburg University - has not been active since 2018
Hamline University - has not been active since 2017
St. Catherine University - has not been active since 2018
University of Minnesota Duluth - the only active chapter currently
University of Minnesota Morris - has not been active since 2018
University of Minnesota Twin Cities - has not been active since 2018, since they merged with USPIRG

References
MPIRG
MPIRG at UMD

Additional Resources 
 The   historical records of MPIRG are available for research use at the Minnesota Historical Society.

Public Interest Research Groups
Government watchdog groups in the United States
Political advocacy groups in the United States
Organizations based in Minneapolis
1971 establishments in Minnesota